Space: 1999, a British science-fiction television series, ran for 48 episodes broadcast between 1975 and 1977. The first series (or season, often referred to as Year One) of 24 episodes began transmission in 1975, though production of the first episode began in 1973. In addition, a number of compilation films have been produced using material from multiple episodes, some containing additional footage. A brief, semi-official series denouement was filmed for exhibition at the Breakaway 1999 fan convention, held in Los Angeles, California in September 1999.

Overview
Individual episodes are intended to be broadcast in a progressive order so that, for Year One, "Breakaway" should be broadcast first, with "Black Sun" and "Earthbound" being broadcast at an early stage to present the Moon entering a new and different part of space and the Alphans encountering their first aliens. However, many stations in the United States aired "Dragon's Domain" (production number 23) as the second instalment after "Breakaway" in September 1975. In the United Kingdom, "Force of Life" (production number 9) was the follow-up to "Breakaway". The other guidelines are that the episodes should progress to show John Koenig's and Helena Russell's relationship develop and blossom. "The Metamorph" should be the first episode of Year Two, followed by the remaining episodes (there is a two-part episode in Year Two) in the order that the days on Russell's status report (which begins each episode) dictates. Regional and national stations aired the series in a wide range of orders. In some cases, this included mixing Year One and Year Two episodes at random. 

Original episode air dates below reflect the order of Space: 1999 as broadcast first, in Australia and the UK.  The transmission dates given below are those for the UK.

Year One (1975–1976)

Episodes

Notes
 Although not broadcast until the summer of 1975, production on the pilot episode, "Breakaway", commenced in November 1973.
 The closing moments of "Breakaway" strongly suggest that the Alphans are considering maintaining contact with the planet Meta and possibly even settling there. The planet "Terra Nova" in the episode "Matter of Life and Death" is considered as Meta, an idea possibly taken from the novelization, though in fact the opening dialogue makes it clear that this is not the first planet that the Alphans have encountered, which Meta would logically have been.
 The description for "Black Sun" is modified from the original ITC summary, which states that the Moon is on collision course with an asteroid that turns into a black sun. In the episode, an asteroid changes course and is destroyed by what the Alphans discover to be a "black sun" or black hole.
 "War Games", stated to be the highest-budgeted single episode of any TV series up to that time, was an overt commentary on humanity's combative nature. After firing pre-emptively on an apparently hostile alien task force, Alpha is devastated by an unstoppable alien enemy that wrecks the base and kills half the inhabitants. In another of the series' metaphysical twists, the Alphans are apparently given a second chance at the end, when time rewinds to moments prior to the attack so that Commander John Koenig may rethink his fateful decision. The aliens inform the Alphans that the events of the episode occurred in an instant of time to show them the consequences of their potential actions.
 "Dragon's Domain" and "Force of Life" are more typical variations on the alien monster theme, although both have more metaphysical leanings. "Dragon's Domain" is essentially a re-telling of the legend of Saint George and the Dragon, while "Force of Life" raises questions about the nature of life, and what forms it could assume.
 "Voyager's Return" essentially serves as an allegory for whether someone who causes death and destruction in the pursuit of knowledge, whether knowingly or unknowingly, can truly redeem himself and be forgiven. It also touches on whether a whole populace can be held responsible for the actions of one of its members.
 "The Testament of Arkadia" predated Glen A. Larson's original Battlestar Galactica TV series by almost three years, in delving into the concept of "life here began out there". The episode also addresses one of the story arcs briefly touched upon throughout Year One, in that the journey of the Alphans might not have been as happenstance as it appeared to be. Additionally, "The Testament of Arkadia" depicts a lifeless planet that holds clues as to the origins of mankind but was ravaged thousands of years earlier in a nuclear war. A similar theme was adopted by Ronald D. Moore for his remake of Battlestar Galactica when dealing with the "original" planet Earth.
 "Death's Other Dominion" addresses the question of what price is too much for advancements in medical science: in this case, the search for the cause of immortality achieved for reasons unknown.

Year Two (1976–1977)

Episodes

Notes
 The time elapsed since leaving Earth orbit may allow an interpretation of the calendar date. However, even if the Alphans still use the Gregorian calendar, Earth has moved forward considerably in time, as evidenced in the episode "Journey to Where", in which it is 2120 on Earth. (The Alphans know that because of the Moon's high velocity, Einsteinian time dilation and the unknown phenomena that hurl them through space, time on Earth would progress more rapidly than on the Moon.) The series was not consistent in how it used this number. The two-part "The Bringers of Wonder", for example, is said to take place hundreds of days apart, which is not possible (although the correct passage of days appeared in the script for "The Bringers of Wonder, Part Two", this was erroneously transcribed in Barbara Bain's script for the post-production recording session). Another time, the events of three episodes seem to occur almost simultaneously ("Devil's Planet" at 2306 days, "The Lambda Factor" at 2308 days and "The Immunity Syndrome" at 2310 days). If the numbers of days mentioned throughout Year Two are accurate, the episodes take place over a period of more than five years (while all the events of Year One passed in under 342 days). Additionally, it is stated, in "Dragon's Domain", that it has been 877 days since the Moon left orbit.
 The Year Two episodes aired on Associated Television over the course of more than a year. Due to a long mid-series gap, some sources consider episodes 2.17 to 2.24 to mark a third series. In some regions of the United Kingdom, the final episode, "The Dorcons", did not air until the summer of 1978. In others, it did not appear until the 1998 BBC Two repeat run. Year Two was available from an earlier date in countries other than the UK; for example, in Canada, CBC had aired all of Year Two by May 1977, and 10 episodes had been aired before transmission began in the UK.
"The Immunity Syndrome" is also a title in an episode of the original science fiction series Star Trek.

Compilation films
Four films were assembled from various episodes of Space: 1999 in the 1970s and 1980s. One aim was to provide content for new American and European cable and satellite TV stations (and for theatrical release, which occurred in a number of European countries). A fifth film, Spazio 1999, was created specifically for theatrical release in Italy. With the exception of Spazio 1999, the films were released on home video years before individual episodes.
 Spazio 1999 is a 1976 Italian release consisting of heavily edited segments from the episodes "Breakaway", "Ring Around the Moon" and "Another Time, Another Place". It features a score by film composer Ennio Morricone, replacing the original score by Barry Gray.
 Destination: Moonbase Alpha, released in 1978 by ITC London, was the first widely available re-edit of Space: 1999, based upon the two-part Year Two episode "The Bringers of Wonder". The narrator informs viewers that it is 2100 and that Moonbase Alpha drew its power from nuclear waste. In many countries, this episode could be seen only in a re-edited form since it did not appear in syndication (although the two episodes were restored for the Region 1 DVD release).
 Alien Attack, released in 1979 by ITC London, retroactively introduces foreign audiences to the premise of the series with a compilation of "Breakaway" and "War Games". It moves events from 1999 far into the 21st century. This film also includes footage specially shot for this release, specifically scenes set in the offices of the International Lunar Commission on Earth.
 Journey Through the Black Sun, released in 1982 by ITC New York, combines the Year One episodes "Collision Course" and "Black Sun". Scenes from both episodes, such as the character of Alan Carter confronting Commander John Koenig in "Black Sun", were cut.
 Cosmic Princess, also released in 1982 by ITC New York, focuses on the Year Two character Maya and combines the episodes "The Metamorph" and "Space Warp". The alien's dialogue from "Space Warp" is altered, and the alien's difficulties, as well as Maya's condition, are presented as being directly related to "The Metamorph" as if the events of that episode occurred only days before. A small number of scenes, such as Maya's father, Mentor, chiding her for what he views as misuse of her shapechanging abilities, were cut. This film appeared in an early episode of the TV series Mystery Science Theater 3000.

Some American VHS editions of the English-language releases include specially filmed introductions by B-movie actress Sybil Danning (who never appeared in the original series). Space: 1999 actors Martin Landau and Barbara Bain were reportedly upset at this re-packaging and launched legal proceedings.

Message from Moonbase Alpha

At the Breakaway 1999 convention, held in Los Angeles, California in 1999, a short featurette entitled Message from Moonbase Alpha premiered on 13 September. Produced by fans and written by Space: 1999 script editor Johnny Byrne, the short film features a tearful monologue performed by actress Zienia Merton in character as Sandra Benes.

The premise of the film, set decades after the events of the TV series (of which "The Dorcons" is the final episode), is that Moonbase Alpha's life-support systems have finally started to fail. Fortunately, a space warp has propelled the Moon to within range of an Earth-like planet, dubbed Terra Alpha. Following a vote (which was contested by some), Commander John Koenig has made the decision for all inhabitants to evacuate Alpha and settle on the planet before the Moon travels out of range. Sandra states that Operation Exodus is a gamble, as the planet is an unknown factor: the Moon is determined to be entering an orbit of sorts, but it will not return to Terra Alpha for another 25 years.

Meanwhile, Maya has devised a way for Alpha to send a message back to Earth using another space warp. Sandra, the last Alphan to leave the Moon, is given the task of sending it, but it is not known when or if the message will arrive. The film ends with the Meta signal (an unidentified radio transmission from nearby planet Meta featured at the end of the pilot episode "Breakaway"), indicating that the first signal the Alphans receive from space is, in fact, one that they have sent to themselves from the future. The featurette was shot on a small set using design elements from both Years One and Two and includes character and special effects footage from various episodes, some of which underwent minor alterations.

With the exception of Sandra, the only series characters mentioned in the present tense (meaning that they are still active at the time of arrival at Terra Alpha) are Maya and John Koenig, but Helena Russell also appears in the title sequences. Sandra also eulogises several notable Alphans who are now deceased, including Victor Bergman and Paul Morrow, and also mentions her fiancé Michael (from "Black Sun") and Luc and Anna (from "The Testament of Arkadia").

Byrne devised Message from Moonbase Alpha to permit the possibility of a sequel series. According to Byrne's revival concept, this series would be set about 25 years later and feature the children of the Alphans who leave Terra Alpha when the Moon and its Moonbase eventually return. Although there was some press and fan speculation regarding the proposal at the end of 1999, the series remains undeveloped. Byrne himself died in 2008.

The original arrangement between all the parties involved in the production of Message from Moonbase Alpha and (then) copyright holders of Space: 1999, Carlton Media International, was that the film would be screened only once, at the September 1999 convention. However, it was subsequently shown at other events and made available as a special feature on various DVD releases in the United States, Canada, France and Italy, in both its original and adapted forms.

References

External links
 
 
 List of Space: 1999 episodes (Year One) at Fanderson.org.uk
 List of Space: 1999 episodes (Year Two) at Fanderson.org.uk
 List of Space: 1999 episodes (Year One) at Space1999.net
 List of Space: 1999 episodes (Year Two) at Space1999.net
 List of Space: 1999 episodes at CliveBanks.co.uk
 List of Space: 1999 episodes at TheVervoid.com

Lists of British action television series episodes
Lists of British science fiction television series episodes